Graeme Jennings may refer to:

 Graeme Jennings (fencer) (1946–1993), Australian Olympic fencer
 Graeme Jennings (violinist) (born 1968), Australian violinist

See also
Graham Jennings, Australian association footballer